Scottburgh is a coastal resort town located on the south coast of KwaZulu-Natal, South Africa. It situated south of the mouth of the Mpambanyoni River (confuser of birds).

History 
Named after Natal Colony Governor John Scott, in 1860 it became the second township at the end of Durban but was initially known as Devonport. Scottburgh then became a very promising port as well as a new attractive location for sugar farms and sugar mills. In about 1850 the town started to attract immigrants especially from Great Britain and Ireland, known as the Byrne Settlers. They came to take advantage of the good harbours, to export their sugar both internally and overseas. Scottburgh became an independent municipality in 1964.

Geography

Location 
Scottburgh is situated on the Umdoni Coast sub-region of the KwaZulu-Natal South Coast, approximately 53 km south-west of Durban and 58 km north-east of Port Shepstone. Neighbouring towns of Scottburgh (excluding those part of Greater Scottburgh) include Amandawe, Dududu, Umkomaas, Clansthal, Umzinto, Sezela and Bazley Beach.

Communities 
The Greater Scottburgh area consists of Scottburgh proper (the main town) which is south of the Mpambanyoni River as well as Freeland Park north of the river and Kelso, Park Rynie, Pennington, Scottburgh South and Selborne Golf Estate to the south of Scottburgh proper.

Drainage 
Scottburgh is a bay situated on the southern banks of the Mpambanyoni River, a short river that culminates in a lagoon. It is one of the best geographic examples of a bay on the South African coast. Mpambanyoni mouth has fluctuated in surface area and volume dramatically over the years, due to the frequent droughts, occasional cyclones, and other extreme weather conditions that can affect KwaZulu-Natal.

Most notorious of the above-mentioned cyclones was Domoina of 1984 and the floods of 1987, which resulted in widespread flooding and infrastructural damage, including the destruction of the Old Main Road bridge from Umkomaas.

Wildlife 
Wildlife found regularly inside the township includes snakes, skinks, geckos, numerous insects, millipedes, bushbuck, mongi, and most famously, large numbers of  vervet monkeys. Genets have been sighted, and there are occasional unverified spottings of civets and similar small felines and cat-like mammals. Birds are abundant, perhaps the most noticeable being the raucous and much-loved hadeda ibis.

The Indian mynah is widespread but regarded as a pest due to its habits of defecating in public restaurants and eating areas and pillaging the nests of native birds. This bird has presented similar problems in other areas in South Africa, Australia and New Zealand. The  sardine run is also visible from the shores of Scottburgh and its surroundings most winters. The umdoni and Strelitzia are the best-known trees specifically associated with Scottburgh and its environs.

Economy 
Scottburgh is also particularly renowned for its large surfing community. Superior waves are to be found along the coast, especially during the winter months. Popular spots include Green Point, Pennington, Kelso, Scottburgh and Rocky Bay. Many other perfect breaks along this coast can be found. Surfers and bodyboarders from around the world come for surf trips around the south coast, and would visit Scottburgh in particular for its worldwide surfing reputation.

However, one appeal of Scottburgh beach is its grass-covered banks leading down to sandy beaches, which have made it a popular holiday resort for holidaymakers for many years.

Most Scottburgh residents work for small local businesses or the state sector, while larger industries are located in the nearby towns of Umkomaas, Umzinto, and Sezela.

North of the Mpambanyoni lies the suburb of Freeland Park, largely residential but also possessing the Cutty Sark Hotel and a river populated by juvenile and adolescent crocodiles. These crocodiles are also the product of the 1987 cyclone, when infant crocodiles escaped from the nearby Crocworld theme park. South of Scottburgh proper, and separated from it by the Country Club, Golf Course, and a considerable expanse of bush, is Scottburgh South, and a few kilometres inland lies the sugarcane farming hamlet of Renishaw, well known for its chapel.

Culture and contemporary life

Tourism 

Scottburgh Main beach along with Pennington and Park Rynie have been awarded blue flag status as of the 2014/15 summer season. Scottburgh and Pennington are both very popular for tourists to make their way to the beach. Scottburgh along with the two hotels and many B&Bs is also home to an award-winning caravan park and camping ground.

The summer season sees many tourists from the inland flock to the beaches of the South Coast. There are many activities that contribute to Scottburgh being a popular destination such as Microlighting, Diving, Shark cage diving, Sea rides, Rock and surf fishing, Surfing, Umdoni Park run, Bicycle trails. There are many more activities that can be inquired at the local South Coast tourism office.

Education 
Scottburgh has several educational institutions, including pre-primary schools, a co-ed primary school, and an English medium co-ed high school.
 Scottburgh Pre-Primary
 Hilltop Pre-Primary
 Casa di Montessori Pre-School
 Scottburgh Primary (Grades 1-7),
 Scottburgh High School (Grades 8-12)
Umdoni Christian Academy (Grades R-12)

Infrastructure

Roads
The N2 national highway runs past Scottburgh bordering it to the west and links the town to Durban in the north-east and Port Shepstone in the south-west. Access to Scottburgh from the N2 is mainly obtained through the P188 interchange (Exit 110) or alternatively the R612 interchange (Exit 104) in Park Rynie. 

Other arterial routes in the Greater Scottburgh area include the R102, R612 and P188. 

The R102 regional route bypasses Scottburgh to the east and links the town to Umkomaas, Umgababa and Kingsburgh in the north-east and Park Rynie, Pennington and Hibberdene in the south-west. 

The R612 regional route begins from the intersection with the R102 in Park Rynie and links the Greater Scottburgh area to Umzinto in the west and Ixopo and Donnybrook in the north-west. 

P188 (Dududu road) is a secondary road that links Scottburgh from its Freeland Park suburb, lifestyle retirement village Rehishaw Hills to the N2 highway and Amandawe in the north-west.

Notable residents 
Well-known people associated with Scottburgh include:

 Dr Thomas Chalmers Robertson – world-renowned conservationist and author
 Joel Stransky – former Springbok rugby player
 Tony Pooley – the late conservationist
 Dave Bell

See also 
Black December

References 

Populated places in the Umdoni Local Municipality
Populated coastal places in South Africa
Populated places established in 1860
KwaZulu-Natal South Coast